"Missile Innovation" is the debut mini-album released by the band Missile Innovation, headed by Ryo Owatari, the former guitarist of Do As Infinity.

Track listing
 "" (Ryo Owatari) – 4:12
 "Manic Monday" (Prince R. Nelson) – 2:59
 "" (Ryo Owatari) – 4:59
 "" (Ryo Owatari) – 4:45
 "" (Ryo Owatari) – 4:56

Personnel
 Ryo Owatari - vocals & guitars
 Hisayoshi Hayashi - drums & Chorus
 Yoshiyasu Hayashi - bass & Chorus
 Akira Murata - keyboards & programming
 Yasuyuki Oguro - guitar technician

Production
 Art Concept - Ryo Owatari & Hideto Oguri
 Illustration - Hideto Oguri
 Design - Ayako Kobayashi
 Photographer - Akiko Handa
 A&R - Miki Kaneko
 A&R Desk - Emiko Nagase
 General Producer - Hiroaki Ito
 Executive Producer - Masato "max" Matsuura & Ryuhei Chiba

Charts
Oricon Sales Chart (Japan)

2005 albums